Gonioglyptus is an extinct genus of trematosaurian temnospondyl within the family Trematosauridae.

See also
 Prehistoric amphibian
 List of prehistoric amphibians

References 

Trematosaurs
Taxa named by Friedrich von Huene
Fossil taxa described in 1920